The ARY Film Award for Best Male Playback Singer is one of the ARY Film Awards of Merit presented annually by the ARY Digital Network and Entertainment Channel to male playback singer, who has delivered an outstanding performance in a film song while working in the film industry.

History

The Best Male Playback Singer category originates with the 1st ARY Film Awards ceremony since 2014. This category has been given to the Best Male Playback Singer by Viewers Voting, but simply called as Best Male Playback Singer. Since ARY Film Awards has been just started, this category has not a brief history. The name of the category officially termed by the channel is:

Winners and nominees 

For the Best Male Playback Singer winner which is decided by Viewers, but simply regarded as Best Male Playback Singer as compared to other four Jury Awards which has superfix of Jury. As of the first ceremony, total of five Male singers were nominated. This category is among fourteen Viewers Awards in ARY Film Awards.

Date and the award ceremony shows that the 2010 is the period from 2010-2020 (10 years-decade), while the year above winners and nominees shows that the film year in which they were releases, and the figure in bracket shows the ceremony number, for example; an award ceremony is held for the films of its previous year.

2010s

References

External links 

 

ARY Film Award winners
ARY Film Awards